Dag Gundersen (15 January 1928 – 2 February 2016) was a Norwegian linguist and lexicographer, dictionary editor and professor. Born in Ringsaker, he was a professor at the University of Oslo from 1985 to 1997 and was the editor of several dictionaries of the Norwegian language. He was a member of the Norwegian Language Council from 1990 to 2000, and since 1993 a member of Norwegian Academy of Science and Letters.

References

1928 births
2016 deaths
People from Ringsaker
Linguists from Norway
Norwegian lexicographers
Academic staff of the University of Oslo
Members of the Norwegian Academy of Science and Letters